Cyberchase is an educational animated sci-fi children's television series that airs on PBS Kids. The series centers around three children from Earth: Jackie, Matt, and Inez, who are brought into Cyberspace, a digital universe, in order to protect the world from the villain Hacker (Christopher Lloyd). They are able to prevent Hacker from taking over Cyberspace by means of problem-solving skills in conjunction with basic math, environmental science, and wellness. In Cyberspace, they meet Digit (Gilbert Gottfried), a "cybird" who helps them on their missions.

Cyberchase was created by WNET New York and premiered on PBS Kids on January 21, 2002. In 2010, after the season 8 finale, Cyberchase went on hiatus, but it returned in 2013 for a ninth season, followed by a tenth season in 2015. The eleventh season premiered on October 23, 2017, and the twelfth season premiered on April 19, 2019.

A thirteenth season was announced on October 19, 2020, and premiered on February 25, 2022. A fourteenth season will premiere on April 21, 2023.

Plot
Motherboard is the "brain of the giant computer system that oversees all of Cyberspace". Her technician computer scientist, Dr. Marbles, kept her functioning properly until his assistant, the Hacker, turned against them. Dr. Marbles drained Hacker's battery and banished him to the Northern Frontier, where he formulated a plan to launch a virus that would attack Motherboard.

When Jackie, Matt, and Inez interact with a library map in the real world, they accidentally allow Hacker access to Motherboard, and she becomes infected with the virus. The kids are brought into Cyberspace and join forces with Digit, a creation of the Hacker who escaped his control. Together they protect the world from the Hacker and his clumsy, accident-prone assistants, Buzz and Delete, until they can recover the Encryptor Chip, a device stolen by Hacker that can nullify the virus and bring Motherboard back to full strength.

Cyberspace consists of planet-like bodies called Cybersites, with each site having a theme such as Ancient Egypt, the American Old West, Greek mythology, and amusement parks. These sites represent the diversity of websites on the Internet, and reflect the many ecosystems and neighborhoods of the Earth. The Cybersquad travels to many of these locations in order to protect them from Hacker, and each inhabited Cybersite has a unique type of Cybercitizen they interact with.

Characters

Main
 Jackie (voiced by Novie Edwards) is an 11-year-old African-American girl who loves to keep things neat and organized in order to figure things out. She has light brown skin and black hair worn in a bun. She wears a yellow sweater with a sky blue denim skirt, red jewelry, and dull lavender hi-tops. Jackie's biggest pet peeve is slimy and icky stuff like bugs and many other "gross" things. Like Inez, she was very fond of Slider. In a running gag in Seasons 1–4, Jackie freaked out when in crisis, pacing while trying to figure out a solution, saying "Make room, I gotta pace!"
 Matt (voiced by Jacqueline Pillon) is an 11-year-old boy who likes skateboards and collecting things. He is impulsive, impatient, tells jokes, and has a great interest in sports. He has fair skin and shaggy orange hair. He usually wears a long-sleeved lime-green T-shirt, a red backpack, neon blue pants, and red hi-tops. He has a pig named Sherman on his family's farm. Matt's red backpack contains his many yo-yos, which he is very good at using and often plays with one whenever he's thinking hard about something. He frequently calls Inez by the nickname "Nezzie", much to her annoyance. It is also shown he can be quite protective of her at times.
 Inez (voiced by Annick Obonsawin) is a 9-year-old Latin-American girl who has an excellent vocabulary (and who knows a large collection of quotes) for which the others often tease her. She has tan skin and shoulder-length brown hair. She mostly wears a pink long-sleeved T-shirt with a yellow star on the front, teal shorts, a purple hooded vest, a pair of black square glasses, and high blue boots. Despite being the youngest human member of the gang, she is the smartest one. Whenever she's thinking up a solution, Inez has a habit of doing handstands to help her concentrate.
 Digit (nicknamed Didge by various people and Didgey by Delete) (voiced by Gilbert Gottfried (seasons 1-13) and later, Ron Pardo (season 14) is a "cybird" (portmanteau of "cyborg" and bird), who works for Motherboard and is the kids' best friend. He and the kids protect Cyberspace and Motherboard from Hacker. Digit was created by Hacker and worked for him along with Buzz and Delete, but escaped after learning of Hacker's evil doings. He became one of Motherboard's helpers, serving as Dr. Marbles' assistant. Digit can fly by spinning his tail feathers in a helicopter-fashion or flapping his wings. However, he has a fear of heights and prefers to walk. He is a cook and wrote his two popular cookbooks The Cyber Chef and Cookin' with the Didge. He carries many objects in his chest, including Widget. He can turn his beak into just about anything and bends it on occasion. He also can disguise his voice very well.
 Hacker (also known as the Hacker) (voiced by Christopher Lloyd) is a mad scientist bent on taking over/creating ultimate chaos for Cyberspace, but he is almost always thwarted by the Cybersquad. He is characterized by a barrel chest with disproportionately small legs, green skin, a bicolored cape, a black wig, and a pointy chin of which he is vain. Hacker was originally created by Dr. Marbles to assist Motherboard, but he rebelled and was exiled to the Northern Frontier. Nevertheless, he does have the potential to become good again, as shown in two episodes where he became a peaceful artist (temporarily) and when he helped the Cybersquad protect the trees in the Northern Frontier. He has two cyborg lackeys, Buzz and Delete, whose reliability is quite variable; sometimes, he gets very peeved when he has to do things himself that Buzz and Delete cannot.
 Buzz and Delete (nicknamed "Buzzy and DeeDee", Buzz voiced by: Len Carlson (seasons 1-4, A Clean Sweep, Designing Mr. Perfect, EcoHaven Ooze and The Flying Parallinis) and Philip Williams (The Halloween Howl, The Fairy Borg Father, Crystal Clear, Inside Hacker, On the Line, A Fraction of a Chance and seasons 6–present); Delete voiced by Robert Tinkler) are Hacker's pair of henchmen, Buzz is a small spherical cyborg with a large mouth and scrawny limbs and Delete is the skinnier and taller. Buzz seems to think he is a big tough guy; however, he can be kind at times and loves doughnuts. Delete is loyal to Hacker for the most part but has occasionally helped the Cybersquad. Unlike Buzz, who is rougher around the edges, Delete is softer and more vulnerable to trickery and deceit. He cares deeply for three things; Buzz, whom he has a brotherly friendship with, his desired pet bunny George (and pets and bunnies in general), and Zanko, his fairy borg father.

"Cyberchase For Real"
 Harry Wilson (played by Matthew A. Wilson) is a character in the "For Real" segment. He often dresses in a nerdish style and wears horn-rimmed glasses and Converse shoes. In many of the segments, he is easily determined and free spirited yet rather careless, which usually costs him his current job. He is also very creative and thought out when he encounters a problem.
 Bianca DeGroat (played by Bianca DeGroat) is a character in the "For Real" segment of the series. She often uses the original plot (the animated main plot) to solve everyday real world problems. As a character, she is rather absent-minded, arrogant, and self-centered, and does not think before she acts. She is seen to get carried away very easily.

Recurring: Team Motherboard
 Motherboard (voiced by Kristina Nicoll) is the benevolent ruler of Cyberspace and mentor to Jackie, Matt, Inez, and Digit. Her former assistant was Hacker who put a virus in her, but because her firewall was not fully uploaded before the virus hit, she was only left weakened. The Cybersquad tries to recover the Encryptor Chip and keep Motherboard safe from Hacker.
 Dr. Marbles (voiced by Richard Binsley) is a smart and brilliant inventor who serves Motherboard. He is responsible for creating Hacker to help and defend Motherboard, although Hacker would later rebel against Motherboard and try to destroy her. A guilty Marbles would then downgrade Hacker's power and banish him to the Northern Frontier for his wrongful actions, right after Hacker vowed to return to finish Motherboard and Marbles off before taking over Cyberspace.
 Widget (voiced by Gilbert Gottfried) is a small likeness of Digit, and can even be stored in his chest. His hat, tail feathers, and bow tie are not screwed on properly. He is younger than Digit and helps him when it is necessary.
 TW "Teeny Weeny Parallini" is a small square girl. She is not scared of Hacker, and despite the fact that her mother would not let her help the Cybersquad, she does help them find Diamond Joe.
 Fluff (voiced by Austin Dilulio) is a penguin that plays hockey, which is hard in Cyberia. He is logical and does not buy into advertisements. Fluff is determined to follow in his father's footsteps and to make his family proud. He helped the Cybersquad with the Hacker's challenge.
 Creech (voiced by Sugar Lyn Beard) is the young ruler of the Cybersite Tikiville. She became the apparent Big Kahuna (the term for their rulers in Tikiville) after competing in a race with other Tikiville-inhabitants as well as Hacker. Creech is in some ways similar to Inez, helping the two to become friends easily. Both have a fairly similar outlook: optimistic until something goes completely wrong, and they both have a large vocabulary. She also is the person in charge of Tikiville's Egg of Benedicta.
 Jules (voiced by Miklos Perlus) was first seen as a cave guard in episode 507, and is a good friend of the Cybersquad, but is often timid. He appears again in episode 607, where Hacker tricks him into pressing the nose of the Jam Master, causing Matt, Jackie, Creech and himself to get sucked into the chamber of Jimaya. After that he appeared in 801 where he helped in Hacker's challenge. He is often trying to find a job, but Hacker continuously tries to ruin it for him.
 Slider (voiced by Tim Hamaguchi) is a serious and James Dean-style 13-year-old skateboarder in Radopolis who builds and repairs skateboards and bikes. Since season three, he has been a recurring character in the series. According to Slider, his father Coop had abandoned him when he was younger because Hacker had hunted Coop for many years. However, in the episode "Measure for Measure" he finds out that his father abandoned him to protect him, and to make sure Hacker does not get an interface card that would allow Hacker to transform into whatever he wishes. If such were to happen, Hacker could cause immense chaos and even rule cyberspace.

Minor and guest stars
Cyberchase has had many guest stars over the years, including Jasmine Guy, Tony Hawk, Al Roker, and Geoffrey Holder. These guest stars appear as citizens of Cybersites, villains, friends, or rulers of the site.

Episodes

Cyberchase For Real
Each Cyberchase episode is followed by "Cyberchase For Real", a live-action educational supplement linking concepts learned in the show to real life experiences. The actors Bianca DeGroat and Matthew A. Wilson (known as Harry Wilson on the show) are in their 30s, but amusingly act in a manner similar to the age of the target audience. "For Real" is produced by WNET in and around New York City after production is completed on the animated segments. These "For Real" segments are broadcast exclusively on PBS in the United States where the program runs longer and fills the time gap where there might be breaks for "commercials". Some "For Real" segments can also be viewed online. In 2012, "Oh Noah", shorts that teach kids to speak Spanish, were used instead of re-running the "For Real" segments. The "For Real" segment returned in season 9.

Development

Conception 
Cyberchase was conceived in 1999 as an educational show that aims to show kids that math is everywhere and everyone can be good at it. The series encourages viewers to see, think, and do mathematics in their world. The show and supporting activities have been designed to support math education and reflect the curriculum standards of the National Council of Teachers of Mathematics. The show's philosophy is to foster enthusiasm for math, to model mathematic reasoning, to help children improve their problem-solving skills and to inspire all children to approach math with confidence and a "can-do" attitude. Later seasons place less emphasis on math and more on environmentalism and wellness. For example, in season 11, the theme of episode 2 is habitat fragmentation, episode 3 is about the effects of temperature on marine ecology, and episode 4 discusses using plants to improve indoor air quality.

Production 
Originally, Thirteen produced the show in partnership with Ontario-based Nelvana for PBS Kids. It aired on PBS Kids since 2002, and on V-me (dubbed in Spanish) from 2004 to 2013. Cyberchase has been animated by Pip Animation Services Inc. since season six; Right Path Pictures did post-production, and Curious Pictures did the original character design. Twelfth Root Music produces the sound track for Cyberchase. Thirteen/WNET New York and Nelvana produced the first five seasons, while Thirteen, in association with Title Entertainment and WNET.ORG, produced seasons six and on. Seasons 1 to 5 used traditional animation, while the sixth season onward used Flash animation.

Broadcast syndication 

The show was syndicated worldwide to countries like the United Kingdom until 2004.

Brand extension 
There are two apps that Cyberchase has released to date:
 Cyberchase 3D Builder
 Cyberchase Shape Quest

Reception

Critical response
On the site Common Sense Media, the show was for ages 5 and up and rated four out of five stars. The reviewer, Joly Herman, commented that "the adventures aren't scary, violent, or sexually inappropriate" but "require fortitude and brain power". Proposed discussion points sprouting from the series include "Can your child take the skills learned in each episode and figure out how to apply it to everyday life?" Herman noted that the only downside was that the adventures did not take place in the "real world" but added that the "For Real" segments solved this problem. The show was given a rating of three out of five smiley faces under "The Good Stuff" section.

Carey Bryson of About.com gave the show a rating of four out of five stars. Bryson noted that the series' explanations of "simple mathematical idea[s]" are "usually explained well and woven throughout the story in a fun and interesting way". The review commended the series for its accessibility: "Children can easily learn from the example in the cartoon story" and praised the "Cyberchase For Real segment that follows each episode". Citing an example from the series using codes, Bryson explained how the show could be used to expand upon the curriculum: "Not only did [her five-year-old] learn about codes, but she also got in a ton of spelling practice". Bryson commended the series: "Educationally, Cyberchase delivers".

Awards
Cyberchase has been nominated for five Daytime Emmys and won in 2007 in the Outstanding Broadband Program category. Cyberchase also won a CINE Golden Eagle in 2006.

: Frances Nankin, Sandra Sheppard, Ellen Doherty, Jill Peters, Bob Morris, Suzanne Rose, Michelle Chen, Elizabeth Hummer, Arash Hoda, Anthony Chapman, David Hirmes, Bianca DeGroat, Matthew A. Wilson, George Arthur Bloom 
: Sandra Sheppard, Frances Nankin, Ellen Doherty, Jill Peters, David Hirmes, Kelly Lafferty, Michelle Chen, Tanner Vea, Bob Morris, Matthew A. Wilson
: Sandra Sheppard, Frances Nankin, Ellen Doherty, David Hirmes, Tanner Vea, Denyse Ouellette, Gilbert Gottfried, Phil Williams, Robert Tinkler 
: Frances Nankin, Sandra Sheppard, Jill Peters, Marj Kleinman, Ellen Doherty, Kristin DiQuollo, Michelle Chen

Home media

See also
Cyberspace, the technological concept

References

External links
 
 PBS Kids: Cyberchase Official Site
 Cyberchase Parents and Teacher Website—lessons, video, and tools to teach math.

2000s American animated television series
2010s American animated television series
2020s American animated television series
2000s American comic science fiction television series
2010s American comic science fiction television series
2020s American comic science fiction television series
2002 American television series debuts
2000s Canadian animated television series
2010s Canadian animated television series
2020s Canadian animated television series
2000s Canadian comic science fiction television series
2010s Canadian comic science fiction television series
2020s Canadian comic science fiction television series
2002 Canadian television series debuts
American children's animated action television series
American children's animated comedy television series
American children's animated space adventure television series
American children's animated science fantasy television series
American children's animated comic science fiction television series
American children's animated education television series
American flash animated television series
American television series with live action and animation
Animated television series about birds
Animated television series about children
Animated television series about robots
Canadian children's animated action television series
Canadian children's animated comedy television series
Canadian children's animated space adventure television series
Canadian children's animated science fantasy television series
Canadian children's animated comic science fiction television series
Canadian children's animated education television series
Canadian flash animated television series
Canadian television series with live action and animation
English-language television shows
Mathematics education television series
PBS Kids shows
PBS original programming
Television series by Nelvana
Television series by WNET
Television shows set in the United States
Works set in computers